EUROSAI - European Organization of Supreme Audit Institutions - is one of the seven regional working groups of the International Organization of Supreme Audit Institutions (INTOSAI).EUROSAI comprises 50 members: Supreme Audit Institutions of 49 countries and the European Court of Auditors.

INTOSAI comprises 191 full members: the Supreme Audit Institutions (SAIs) of 190 countries and the European Court of Auditors (and 4 associate members) and is listed as a support organisation of the United Nations.

History 

EUROSAI was set up in 1990 with 30 members (the SAIs of 29 European States and the European Court of Auditors). Now membership stands at 50 SAIs (the SAIs of 49 European States and the European Court of Auditors).
Although EUROSAI is the junior of INTOSAI’s seven Regional Working Groups, the idea of a European organisation of SAIs dates back to the foundation of INTOSAI in 1953. The first active steps towards the establishment of EUROSAI took place in 1974 during the VIII INTOSAI Congress in Madrid (1974). Between 1975 and 1989 the SAIs of Italy and Spain, counting on the Contact Committee of Heads of SAIs of the European Economic Community countries, paved the way for EUROSAI by preparing the initial drafts of EUROSAI Statutes. In June 1989 the XIII INTOSAI Congress, held in Berlin, adopted the “Berlin Declaration” comprising the agreement of creating the European organisation of SAIs.
In November 1990, the Constitutive Conference and the first Congress of EUROSAI were held in Madrid (Spain). During this event, the first EUROSAI President and Governing Board were elected, the Statutes were debated and approved, and the headquarters and permanent Secretariat were established.

Matanyahu Englman, the State Comptroller and Ombudsman of the State of Israel, is vice-president of the organization and  slated to become its president in 2024.

Tasks 
The objectives of the organisation, defined in Article 1 of its Statutes, are to promote professional cooperation among SAI members and other organizations, to encourage the exchange of information and documentation, to advance the study of public sector audit, to stimulate the creation of university professorships in this subject and to work towards the harmonisation of terminology in the field of public sector audit.

EUROSAI undertakes its activity through three bodies, i.e. the Congress, the Governing Board and the Secretariat.

Congress 
According to the organisation’s Statutes, the EUROSAI Congress is the supreme authority of the organisation and consists of all its members. It is convened every three years. Up to now, the following congresses have taken place:
 1990: Madrid, Spain (Constitutive Conference)
 1993: Stockholm, Sweden
 1996: Prague, Czech Republic
 1999: Paris, France
 2002: Moscow, Russian Federation
 2005: Bonn, Germany
 2008: Kraków, Poland
 2011: Lisbon, Portugal
 2014: The Hague, The Netherlands
 2017: Istanbul, Turkey
2021: Czech Republic

Governing Board 
According to the Statutes, the EUROSAI Governing Board is composed of eight members: four full-fledged members (Heads of the SAIs that hosted the last two ordinary sessions of Congress, Head of the SAI to hold the next regular session of Congress, and Secretary General of EUROSAI), and four members elected by the Congress for a period of six years (two members renewable every three years). The Heads of SAIs that are part of the INTOSAI Governing Board and are EUROSAI members also participate in the Governing Board, as observers.

Secretariat 
The Secretariat is held permanently by the SAI of Spain (Tribunal de Cuentas), which is also the EUROSAI headquarters.

Strategic Plan 
The VIII EUROSAI Congress in Lisbon adopted the EUROSAI Strategic Plan 2011-2017. This first strategic plan defines the organisation’s mission, vision and values:

 Mission: EUROSAI is the organisation of the Supreme Audit Institutions in Europe. Its members work together in order to strengthen public sector auditing in the region, thereby contributing to the work of INTOSAI.
 Vision: EUROSAI promotes good governance, including accountability, transparency and integrity. It provides a dynamic framework for cooperation and assists its members in fulfilling their mandates in the best possible manner.
 Values: Independence, integrity, professionalism, credibility, inclusiveness, cooperation, innovation, sustainability, respect for the environment.

It is based on 4 strategic goals that reflect the needs and priorities of the organisation’s membership:

 Goal 1 – Capacity Building: Building capacity of SAIs means developing skills, knowledge, structures and ways of working that make an organisation more effective, building on existing strengths and dressing gaps and weaknesses. EUROSAI is committed to facilitating the development of strong, independent and highly professional SAIs.	
 Goal 2 – Professional Standards: In order to perform their duties competently and professionally, SAIs need an up-to-date framework of professional international standards. INTOSAI is developing a set of such standards. EUROSAI will promote and facilitate their implementation by its members tailored to their respective tasks and needs.
 Goal 3 – Knowledge Sharing: In order to strengthen public sector auditing, accountability, good governance and transparency in the region, EUROSAI aims to improve sharing of knowledge, information and experiences between its members and with external partners.
 Goal 4 – Governance and Communication: In order to perform its mission efficiently and to enhance its capacity to cope with the demands of its members, EUROSAI needs to be well managed.

The current model has been designed in accordance with the principles of good governance and effective communication. This model also reflects the strategic goals, encourages the widest possible involvement of the member SAIs in the work of the organisation, and builds strong links among all EUROSAI bodies that are involved in implementing the strategic plan.

References

External links
 www.eurosai.org

International Organization of Supreme Audit Institutions
Auditing organizations
Organizations established in 1990